Monterosa, also known as Neptune Lodge, is a historic home located in Warrenton, Virginia. The original house constructed about 1847–1848, and is a -story, stuccoed brick house with a gable roof and side-passage plan.

History
The house has sustained several periods of alteration and now manifests the proportions and details of the Colonial Revival style. Also on the property are the contributing Italianate style brick stable (c. 1847); a brick smokehouse; and a two-story single-pile dwelling that dates from the late-19th century and is known as the Office.

It was listed on the National Register of Historic Places in 1991.

References

Houses on the National Register of Historic Places in Virginia
Italianate architecture in Virginia
Colonial Revival architecture in Virginia
Houses completed in 1848
Houses in Fauquier County, Virginia
National Register of Historic Places in Fauquier County, Virginia